Bischofsheim in der Rhön (before January 2020: Bischofsheim an der Rhön) is a town in the district Rhön-Grabfeld, in Bavaria, Germany. It is situated in the Rhön Mountains, 29 km southeast of Fulda.

Town Structure
Several originally separate villages became part of the town Bischofsheim. These are Frankenheim, Haselbach, Oberweißenbrunn, Unterweißenbrunn and Wegfurt.

History
In a document of the early 13th century Bischofsheim was first mentioned. The town is much older, probably 8th century. The name Bischofsheim (German: home of the bishop) indicates that the town was maybe founded by Saint Boniface. As Bischofsheim is situated between Fulda and the palatinate Salz, Boniface founded a settlement to rest on the way.

Sights
 Altenbrenda Castle ruins
 Kreuzberg, 2nd highest mountain of the Rhön Mountains (932 metres)
 Kloster Kreuzberg (monastery, built 1681 – 1692)
 Town tower Zehntturm (13th century, 26 metres high)

Born in Bischofsheim 

 Johann Joseph von Prechtl (1778-1854), Austrian technical researcher
 Hans Schlenck (1901-1944), German stage and film actor, theater director
 Hermann Hartmann (1914-1984), German chemist

References

External links
 Bischofsheim an der Rhön travel guide on Wikivoyage

Rhön-Grabfeld
Rhön Mountains